Hands is the debut studio album by English singer and songwriter Little Boots. It was released on 5 June 2009 by 679 Recordings and Atlantic Records to generally positive reviews. Many critics complimented its "well-crafted" pop songs and "diverse" production. Hands primarily features songs about love, relationships and heartbreak, and takes influence from a variety of music styles such as disco, 1980s synth-pop and Eurodance.

The album reached number five on the UK Albums Chart, and its first two singles, "New in Town" and "Remedy", peaked at numbers 13 and six on the UK Singles Chart, respectively.

Recording and production
Little Boots began recording her debut album in Los Angeles with Greg Kurstin and Hot Chip's Joe Goddard in early 2008. While in Los Angeles, she spent two days recording with RedOne. Following the BBC Sound of 2009 poll, which Little Boots won, her record label, management and A&R team scheduled recording sessions with Dr. Luke. These sessions, however, never took place. In January 2009, Little Boots began to compile the album's track listing, a difficult process for the singer, who compared it to "cutting a limb off".

The album's title comes from the song "Hands". Included on the album as a hidden track, its lyrics tell the story of a person with a broken heart who tries desperately to mend it. The album cover for Hands was "inspired by old Italo covers like Patrick Cowley and Amanda Lear that have lots of space and fantasy themes." According to Little Boots, the artwork is a mixture of the past and the present, a reflection of the musical styles featured on the album.

Composition

"New in Town", the album's opening track, was inspired by the "seedy side of life" in Los Angeles and the strange individuals Little Boots met while recording Hands. It was chosen as the album's lead single because "it's very bold and colourful and doesn't really sound like anything else out there." Released on 25 May 2009, "New in Town" peaked at number 13 on the UK Singles Chart. The album's second track, "Earthquake", received positive reviews from critics, with one reviewer stating that it was a "strikingly affecting, emotionally naked galactic banger". The song was released as the album's third and final single on 16 November 2009, peaking at number 84 on the UK Singles Chart. "Stuck on Repeat" was composed with Australian singer Kylie Minogue in mind. Inspired by the disco era, it was compared to Donna Summer's 1977 song "I Feel Love" by music critics. The fifth track on the album, "Remedy", was released on 17 August 2009 as the second single from Hands and managed to outpeak its predecessor, reaching number six on the UK Singles Chart.

"Meddle", the album's sixth track, was released as a limited-edition single in August 2008. Described by The Times as a "barnstormer" and a "disco/drum and bass hybrid", it reached number 97 on the UK chart. "Ghost", a song about being ignored by a loved one, received mixed reviews from critics. In a review for The Guardian, Alexis Petridis described it as a "clunky attempt to blend electronics with Brecht-and-Weill oompah". The song "Mathematics" is inspired by Sylvia Plath's poem Love Is a Parallax. In the song, Little Boots uses mathematics as a metaphor for love. The ninth track, "Symmetry", a duet with The Human League singer Philip Oakey, was a "dream" for Little Boots. A fan of the band, she was surprised when Oakey agreed to provide vocals for the track. The synth ballads "Tune into My Heart" and "Hearts Collide" were compared to Minogue, with Gigwise referring to "Hearts Collide" as the "greatest Kylie track never recorded by the Australian". The closing track from Hands, "No Brakes", features a spoken interlude which was compared to the Pet Shop Boys and Mike Yarwood.

Promotion and release
To promote the album, Little Boots did several performances worldwide. Her first televised appearance was on Later... with Jools Holland on 7 November 2008. She was invited to perform on the show after posting songs on the social networking website Myspace. On 4 March 2009, Little Boots appeared on the American late-night television show Last Call with Carson Daly. She was interviewed by Daly and several clips from a Los Angeles nightclub performance were shown. Little Boots performed "Stuck on Repeat" using the Tenori-on on the 11 May 2009 edition of BBC Breakfast. She returned to Later... with Jools Holland on 15 May 2009. This was followed by an appearance on the BBC Radio 4 programme Woman's Hour on 27 May 2009. She also appeared on Friday Night with Jonathan Ross on 3 July 2009. On 26 May 2009, Little Boots performed four songs from Hands at the Apple Store in London. These songs were included on the extended play iTunes Live from London, which was released exclusively through iTunes on 1 June 2009.

The album was released in the United Kingdom on 8 June 2009 as a CD and digital download. Little Boots' official website offered an exclusive bundle for pre-order which included the CD, a limited-edition galactic speckled 12-inch vinyl copy of the album and a 33-minute "Hands On" mix MP3 featuring album material, non-album tracks and remixes. The 12-inch vinyl was limited to 1,000 copies. Due to overwhelming demand, the limited-edition 12-inch vinyl was released on 10 June 2009, two days later than had previously been announced.

Critical reception

Hands received generally positive reviews from music critics. At Metacritic, which assigns a normalised rating out of 100 to reviews from mainstream publications, the album received an average score of 68, based on 20 reviews. Michael Cragg of musicOMH called it "a well-crafted, glorious pop record". K. Ross Hoffman of AllMusic viewed the album as "a solid batch with several standouts [...] but no space-filling duds or truly weak links". David Renshaw of Gigwise described Hands as "a big pop album" that "rival[s] Lady GaGa, Girls Aloud or Lily Allen." Ben Thompson of The Observer complimented the album's "diverse" production and called the song "Symmetry", a duet with Philip Oakey, a "joyous cross-generational head-to-head". Melissa Maerz of Entertainment Weekly commented that on Hands, Little Boots is "great at taking superstar glamour to the streets", dubbing the album "megaclub gold for the broke-ass rest of us." The Guardians Alexis Petridis referred to Hands as "a surprisingly modern-sounding record from an artist who has been depicted as in thrall to a kitsch vision of 80s pop". Ian Wade of BBC Music praised the album as "a solid pop debut, the sort of album which unites lovers of pop, young and old", and compared it to albums by Goldfrapp, Kylie Minogue and Annie. Emily Mackay of NME wrote that "Little Boots gives us an inspiring story of self-realisation" and called the album "brilliant".

Peter Paphides of The Times named "Stuck on Repeat" the album's "best moment" due to its "exquisite vulnerability". Andrzej Lukowski of Drowned in Sound remarked that "Hesketh can write a damn good pop song, and whether that's what caused the initial buzz, it's something hard to deny when presented with the cold, hard proof of Hands." Marc Hogan of Pitchfork labelled Hands as "a mainstream pop effort with an indie-friendly narrative", while noting that the album's "most distinguishing characteristic is an unusual level of meta-pop self-awareness." The Independents Andy Gill felt that the album has "safe, conformist electropop grooves following lines as straight and satisfying as supermarket aisles", concluding that "the result is a form of attention-deficit pop: for while 'New in Town' and 'Earthquake' have an instant appeal, it's striking how quickly one's palate is sated by their pop-rock fizz: the listener who can play Hands all the way through is either dedicated, or dead." Paul Schrodt of Slant Magazine argued that while the album "smacks of trying too hard", most of the songs "are imminently playable on their own terms, whether it's a Robyn-style, slow-burning heartache ('No Brakes') or enjoyably Eurotrash camp ('Hearts Collide')." In a mixed review, Joe Zadeh of Clash stated that the album "falls victim to attempts to reach beyond more boundaries than necessary, and thus ironically loses the concentration of the more earnest listener."

Commercial performance
Hands debuted at number five on the UK Albums Chart, selling 19,952 copies in its first week. During its second week, it dropped to number 40. Following the release of "Remedy", the album returned to the top 30 on 23 August 2009 for four consecutive weeks. On 4 September 2009, the album was certified gold by the British Phonographic Industry (BPI) for shipments in excess of 100,000 copies in the UK. Hands debuted at number 20 on the Irish Albums Chart for the week ending 11 June 2009, falling to number 44 the following week and eventually dropping off the chart. On the issue dated 27 June 2009, the album debuted at number 19 on the European Top 100 Albums chart, where it spent four weeks.

Elsewhere, Hands peaked at number four on the ARIA Hitseekers Albums chart in Australia and at number 36 in Japan. In the United States, the album debuted at number seven on Billboards Heatseekers Albums chart on 20 March 2010. As of March 2013, Hands had sold 17,000 copies in the US, according to Nielsen SoundScan.

Track listing

Notes
  signifies an additional producer
  signifies a vocal producer
  signifies a remixer
 Digital versions of the album do not include "Hands" as a hidden track and "No Brakes" is 4:02 (the US Streaming Version has Hands as a Hidden Track).

Personnel
Credits adapted from the liner notes of Hands.

Musicians
 Little Boots – vocals
 RedOne – vocal arrangement 
 Philip Oakey – guest vocals 
 Roy Kerr – programming 
 Anu Pillai – programming, synthesisers

Technical

 Greg Kurstin – production ; mixing ; additional production 
 Serban Ghenea – mixing 
 John Hanes – engineering for mix 
 Tim Roberts – engineering assistance 
 Joe Goddard – production 
 Tom Elmhirst – mixing 
 Dan Parry – mixing assistance 
 Jas Shaw – production, mixing ; recording 
 Fred Ball – production ; additional production, vocal production 
 Lexxx – mixing 
 RedOne – production, vocal editing, recording, engineering 
 Johnny Severin – vocal editing, recording, engineering 
 Robert Orton – mixing 
 Kid Gloves – production 
 Anu Pillai – engineering 
 Jamie Smithson – engineering assistance 
 Pascal Gabriel – vocal production 
 Semothy Jones – production 
 Richard "Biff" Stannard – production 
 Julian Peake – production 
 Ash Howes – mixing 
 Al O'Connell – engineering

Artwork
 Chrissie Abbott – design
 Jonas Bresnan – photography

Charts

Weekly charts

Year-end charts

Certifications

Release history

References

2009 debut albums
679 Artists albums
Albums produced by Ash Howes
Albums produced by Greg Kurstin
Albums produced by RedOne
Albums produced by Richard Stannard (songwriter)
Albums produced by Semothy Jones
Atlantic Records albums
Little Boots albums